The Tallest Tree in our Forest is a 1977 documentary film directed and written by Gil Noble, about singer, actor and activist, Paul Robeson. It was shot on 16mm film and was started shortly before Robeson's death at age 77 in 1976. The film features rare archival footage, interviews, and still photography from the twentieth century. The title is taken from a 1940s statement made by Mary McLeod Bethune describing Paul Robeson. The film was originally available in a three-part format for use on public-access television channels and in classrooms for ages fourteen and above.

Interviewers
 Paul Robeson
 Harry Belafonte
 Lloyd Brown
 Dizzy Gillespie
 Paul Robeson, Jr.
 John Henrik Clarke

References

1977 films
Works about Paul Robeson
1977 documentary films
1970s English-language films